Solo Wings CC was a South African aircraft manufacturer based in Gillitts, KwaZulu-Natal. The company specialized in the design and manufacture of ultralight trikes in the form of ready-to-fly aircraft for the European Fédération Aéronautique Internationale microlight category.

The company seems to have gone out of business circa 2012 and production of its Solo Wings Aquilla design taken over by Microcrafts Africa.

The company produced two ultralight trike designs, starting with the entry-level Windlass, powered by the Rotax 503  twin cylinder, two-stroke, air-cooled aircraft engine in about 1987. More than 600 of this model had been delivered by 2001. In the 1990s the more sophisticated Aquilla was introduced.

Bateleur Sky Sports
Both Solo Wings models were sold in the United States by a Solo Wings distributor, Bateleur Sky Sports, Inc. of Palm Coast, Florida and later Fort Lauderdale, Florida from the late 1990s until the early 2000s under their own name as the Bateleur Windlass and Bateleur Aquilla. Bateleur Sky Sports appears to have gone out of business in about 2004.

Aircraft

References

External links

 redirects to Microcrafts Africa
Company website archives on Archive.org

Companies based in KwaZulu-Natal
Defunct aircraft manufacturers of South Africa
Ultralight aircraft
Homebuilt aircraft
Ultralight trikes
EThekwini Metropolitan Municipality